The 2007 MasterCard Memorial Cup was played in May 2007 in Vancouver, British Columbia, at the Pacific Coliseum. It was the 89th annual Memorial Cup competition and determined the major junior ice hockey champion of the Canadian Hockey League (CHL).  The tournament was competed between the WHL champion, the Medicine Hat Tigers; the OHL champion, the Plymouth Whalers; the QMJHL champion, the Lewiston Maineiacs; and the host team and tournament champion, Vancouver Giants, who were competing in their second consecutive national junior championship. The Memorial Cup tournament was a four team tournament with a round-robin format. The Giants won their first Memorial Cup, defeating Medicine Hat 3–1 in the second all-WHL final in tournament history (the first was in 1989).  The tournament set a new Memorial Cup attendance record with 121,561 fans attending the nine games.  The previous record of 84,686 was set at the 2003 tournament in Quebec City.

The tournament was the first to feature two league champions based in the United States, from Lewiston, Maine and Plymouth, Michigan, respectively. The only previous Memorial Cup to feature two American teams was the 1998 Memorial Cup, featuring the WHL champion, the Portland Winter Hawks and the host, the Spokane Chiefs.

The 2007 MasterCard Memorial Cup was also the first to feature the two-referee system.

The Memorial Cup trophy's ties to Canadian military were evident when Canadian Forces units delivered it to the championship by sea, aboard ; by air, hoisted aboard a CH-149 Cormorant helicopter; and by land, via the armoured 39th Canadian Brigade Group Convoy.

Round-robin standings

Rosters

Schedule

Round robin

Playoff round

Tie breaker

Semi-final

Championship game

Leading scorers

Leading goaltenders
Goalies Have To Play A Minimum Of 60 Minutes To Be Listed.

Award winners
Stafford Smythe Memorial Trophy (MVP): Milan Lucic, Vancouver
George Parsons Trophy (Sportsmanship): Brennan Bosch, Medicine Hat
Hap Emms Memorial Trophy (Goaltender): Matt Keetley, Medicine Hat
Ed Chynoweth Trophy (Leading Scorer): Michal Repik, Vancouver

All-star team
Goal: Matt Keetley, Medicine Hat
Defence: Brendan Mikkelson, Vancouver; Cody Franson, Vancouver
Forwards: Darren Helm, Medicine Hat; Michal Repik, Vancouver; Milan Lucic, Vancouver

Road to the cup

OHL playoffs

QMJHL playoffs

†Shawinigan seeded 8th in Eastern division.

WHL playoffs

References

External links
 Memorial Cup 
 Canadian Hockey League

2006–07 in Canadian ice hockey
2007
Ice hockey competitions in Vancouver
2000s in Vancouver
2007 in British Columbia